Alvis James Whitted (born September 4, 1974) is a former American football wide receiver.

Early years
Whitted played two years as a wide receiver at Orange High School in Hillsborough, North Carolina and was also a standout in track and field and was state champion as a senior in the 100 and 200 meters.

College career
Whitted played his college football at North Carolina State University. He played as a wide receiver.

Track and field
Whitted was also a standout in track and field and was state champion as a senior in the 100 and 200 meters. He recorded personal bests of 10.02 seconds in the 100 meters and 20.03 seconds in the 200 meters.

Whitted participated in the 1996 U.S. Olympic Trials, where he finished in sixth place in the 200 meters, with a time of 20.29 seconds, running against Michael Johnson and Carl Lewis.

Personal bests

Professional career
Whitted was drafted in the seventh round of the 1998 NFL Draft by the Jacksonville Jaguars, where he played until he was picked up by the Atlanta Falcons in 2002.

He was released by the Falcons but signed with the Raiders shortly after and played special teams during the 2002 NFL season and the team's Super Bowl XXXVII loss. He played as a wide receiver and on special teams from 2003 onwards.

In the 2006 season, Whitted won a starting job at receiver for the Raiders. He totaled 27 receptions for 299 yards on the year with no touchdowns. Whitted was released by the Raiders on September 1, 2007.

Coaching career

UCLA Bruins
Whitted spent the 2011 season on Rick Neuheisel's staff at UCLA, as offensive quality-control assistant. At UCLA, Whitted worked with wide receivers and special teams, and helped prepare the offense for games by heading the defensive scout team.

Colorado State Rams
On February 6, 2012, Whitted was named wide receivers coach at Colorado State University. While at Colorado State, he helped mold Rashard Higgins and Michael Gallup into Biletnikoff Award finalist receivers.

Green Bay Packers
On January 30, 2019, Whitted became the next wide receivers coach for the Green Bay Packers of the National Football League (NFL).

Wisconsin Badgers
On March 4, 2020, Whitted was announced as the wide receivers coach for the Wisconsin Badgers.

Utah Utes
On January 24 2023, he was announced as the new wide receivers coach for the Utah Utes.

References

1974 births
Living people
American football wide receivers
NC State Wolfpack football players
Jacksonville Jaguars players
Atlanta Falcons players
Oakland Raiders players
People from Hillsborough, North Carolina
Sportspeople from Durham, North Carolina